Lanty is a commune in the Nièvre department in central France.

Of the old Fort of Lanty nothing but earthworks remains in the field behind the church. The 19th Century Château de Lanty was the residence in later years of school text author the Abbe Drioux.

Demographics
On 1 January 2019, the estimated population was 116.

See also
Communes of the Nièvre department

References

Communes of Nièvre